Polygamy and Polyandry in Sri Lanka 

Both Polygamy and polyandry  were practiced in Sri Lanka till the end of colonial period.

References

Society of Sri Lanka
Sri Lanka